Vobkent is a city in the Bukhara Region of Uzbekistan and the capital of Vobkent District. It is famous for a minaret constructed in 1196–1198, under the reign of Ala ad-Din Tekish.

Vabkent is situated ca. 28 km from the city of Bukhara. Its population is 17,800 (2016). It has textile industry and poultry.

See also
 Amir Sultan

References

External links
 
 Vabkent article on WikiMir

Populated places in Bukhara Region
Cities in Uzbekistan
World Heritage Tentative List